The Eudaminae are a subfamily of skipper butterflies (family Hesperiidae). Their original type genus Eudamus is today a junior synonym of Urbanus. They are largely found in the Neotropics, with some extending into temperate North America, and one genus, Lobocla, endemic to East Asia.

Taxonomy
The Eudaminae have been recent subject to significant taxonomic revisions based on genome analysis, including by Brower & Warren 2009, and Li et al. 2019. 

Historically, the subfamily has been included as tribe Eudamini in subfamily Pyrginae, based on perceived similarities with two of the tribes in that subfamily, the Celaenorrhinini and Pyrgini. As of Li et al. 2019, the Eudaminae are divided into four tribes: Entheini, Phocidini, Eudamini and Oileidini.

Current status and subdivisions
Except where otherwise noted, the classification below follows Li et al., 2019:

Tribe Entheini
Drephalys Watson, 1893
Udranomia A. Butler, 1870
Phanus Hübner, [1819]
Hyalothyrus Mabille, 1878
Entheus Hübner, [1819]
Augiades Hübner, [1819]
Tarsoctenus E. Watson, 1893

Tribe Phocidini
Phocides Hübner, [1819]
Pseudonascus Austin, 2008
Nascus E. Watson, 1893
Aurina Evans, 1937
Emmelus O. Mielke & Casagrande , 2016
Porphyrogenes E. Watson, 1893
Nicephellus Austin, 2008
Salatis Evans, 1952
Salantoia Grishin, 2019
Sarmientoia Berg, 1897
Bungalotis E. Watson, 1893
Euriphellus Austin, 2008
Dyscophellus Godman & Salvin, 1893
Phareas Westwood, 1852
Ornilius Grishin, 2022
Fulvatis Grishin, 2022
Adina Grishin, 2022

Tribe Eudamini

Subtribe Eudamina
Cecropterus Herrich-Schäffer, 1869
Spicauda Grishin, 2019
Urbanus Hübner, [1807]
Telegonus Hübner, [1819]
Autochton Hübner, 1823
Spathilepia A. Butler, 1870
Astraptes Hübner, [1819]
Narcosius Steinhauser, 1986
Proteides Hübner, [1819]
Epargyreus Hübner, [1819]
Chioides Lindsey, 1921

Subtribe Loboclina
Aguna R. Williams, 1927
Zeutus Grishin, 2019
Lobocla Moore, 1884
Lobotractus Grishin, 2019
Codatractus Lindsey, 1921
Zestusa Lindsey, 1925
Ridens Evans, 1952
Venada Evans, 1952

Subtribe Cephisina
Cephise Evans, 1952

Subtribe Telemiadina
Ectomis Mabille, 1878
Telemiades Hübner, [1819]
Polygonus Hübner, [1825]

Tribe Oileidini

Subtribe Oileidina
Flattoides Grishin, 2019
Oileides Hübner, [1825]

Subtribe Typhedanina
Typhedanus A. Butler, 1870
Oechydrus E. Watson, 1893
Cogia A. Butler, 1870
Nerula Mabille, 1888
Marela Mabille, 1903

Footnotes and references

 
Butterfly subfamilies
Taxa named by Paul Mabille